The 2021 Copa Libertadores Final was the final match which decided the winner of the 2021 Copa Libertadores. This was the 62nd edition of the Copa Libertadores, the top-tier South American continental club football tournament organized by CONMEBOL.

The match was played on 27 November 2021 at the Estadio Centenario in Montevideo, Uruguay, between Brazilian sides Palmeiras and Flamengo.

Palmeiras defeated Flamengo by a 2–1 score after extra time in the final to win their third title in the tournament, and second in a row.
As winners of the 2021 Copa Libertadores, they qualified for the 2021 FIFA Club World Cup and earned the right to play against the winners of the 2021 Copa Sudamericana in the 2022 Recopa Sudamericana. They also automatically qualified for the 2022 Copa Libertadores group stage.

Venue 

On 13 May 2021, CONMEBOL announced that Estadio Centenario in Montevideo was chosen for the 2021 final.

Teams

Road to the final

Note: In all scores below, the score of the home team is given first.

Match 
Marcos Rocha (Palmeiras) and Léo Pereira (Flamengo) were ruled out of the final due to suspensions.

Details

See also 

 2021 Copa Sudamericana Final
 2022 Recopa Sudamericana

References

External links 
 CONMEBOL.com

2021
Final
2021 in South American football
November 2021 sports events in South America
Sociedade Esportiva Palmeiras matches
CR Flamengo matches
2021 in Uruguayan football
Brazilian football clubs in international competitions
International club association football competitions hosted by Uruguay